Paballo Mavundla (born 11 June 1999) is a South African actor known for his debut role Nkosana on Mzansi Magic's supernatural drama series The Herd and as Jerah Moroka on Generations: The Legacy.

Background 
Mavundla was born in the Meadowlands of the heart of South Western Soweto in the Gauteng Province. The actor matriculated with a bachelor in Dramatic Arts from the National School of the Arts, Johannesburg in 2017. He later revealed that being at the institution played a vital role throughout in his career.

Career 
After several times of auditioning and not receiving a role, the actor landed his first professional job in the supernatural drama The Herd, where he depicted the role of a naughty and rebellious teen, Nkosana.

He later joined the SABC1 soapie Generations: The Legacy in November 2018. He was tasked with the role of Jerah Moroka also known as Crazy J, a misbehaved cousin of the Morokas who is a varsity student and later works at Ezweni Communications.

Filmography

References

1999 births
Living people